Arc Light is the second studio album by contemporary folk three-piece Lau, released on March 30, 2009 on Navigator Records.

The album's bonus track is a cover of The Beatles' song, "Dear Prudence". The track originally appeared on a compilation issued free with Mojo magazine.

Reception
Like its predecessor, Lightweights and Gentlemen, Arc Light garnered strong critical acclaim upon release. Chris Nickson of Allmusic described the album as "stirring and utterly wonderful," while Michael Quinn, of BBC Music remarked that "what astonishes most about Lau is the orchestral quality of the sound." Music webzine The Line of Best Fit stated that: "Arc Light is testament to their constant need to push themselves as musicians, and as innovators of the folk movement."

Track listing
All tracks arranged by Kris Drever, Martin Green and Aidan O'Rourke
 "The Burrian" (Drever/Green/O'Rourke)
 "Winter Moon" (Drever/Green/O'Rourke)
 "Horizontigo"
 "Horizontigo" (Drever)
 "Alright in the Heid" (Green)
 "Salty Boys"
 "Operation Knoydart (O'Rourke)
 "Salty Boys" (Drever)
 "Banks of Marble" (Les Rice/Drever/Green/O'Rourke)
 "Stephen's"
 "Stephen's Leaving" (Green)
 "Plot No.12" (O'Rourke)
 "The Master" (Drever/Green/O'Rourke)
 "Frank and Flo's"
 "Frank and Flo's" (Green)
 "An Tobar" (O'Rourke)
 "Temple of Fiddes" (Drever/O'Rourke)

Bonus track
"Dear Prudence" (John Lennon/Paul McCartney)

Personnel
The following people contributed to Arc Light

Band
Kris Drever - guitar, vocals
Martin Green - accordion
Aidan O'Rourke - fiddle

Additional musicians
Stuart Nisbet - pedal steel guitar
Corrina Hewat - backing vocals
Karine Polwart - backing vocals
Inge Thomson - backing vocals

Recording personnel
Calum Malcolm - producer, mixing, mastering
Lau (band) - mixing
Stuart Hamilton - engineering

Artwork
David Angel - photography

References

2009 albums
Lau (band) albums